New Jersey elected its members October 13, 1818.

See also 
 1818 and 1819 United States House of Representatives elections
 List of United States representatives from New Jersey

Notes 

1818
New Jersey
United States House of Representatives